The Battle of Yarkhand was a confrontation that took place in April 1934 at Yarkand, Xinjiang, China. Gen. Ma Zhancang's Chinese Muslim army defeated Uighur and Afghan volunteers sent by King Mohammed Zahir Shah, and killed them all. The emir Abdullah Bughra was killed and beheaded, his head being put on display at Idgah mosque.

References

Yarkand
20th century in Xinjiang
1934 in China
April 1934 events